D38 is a state road in the Slavonia region of Croatia that connects the cities of Pakrac, Požega, Pleternica and Đakovo.

The road, as well as all other state roads in Croatia, is managed and maintained by Hrvatske Ceste, state owned company.

Traffic volume 

Traffic is regularly counted and reported by Hrvatske Ceste, operator of the road.

Road junctions

Maps

Sources

See also
 A3 motorway

D038
D038